Layne Ulmer (born September 14, 1980) is a Canadian professional ice hockey player who most recently played centre for Manchester Storm in the EIHL.

Playing career
Ulmer was drafted 209th overall in the 1999 NHL Entry Draft by the Ottawa Senators while playing for the Swift Current Broncos of the Western Hockey League.

On June 13, 2001, Ulmer was signed as a free agent by the New York Rangers and played one game with the Rangers in the National Hockey League in the 2003–04 season. Ulmer spent the majority of his contract with the Rangers affiliate, the Hartford Wolf Pack of the American Hockey League.

Ulmer spent the 2005–06 season with the San Antonio Rampage before leaving for TPS Turku of the SM-liiga. In 2007 Layne played for the DEL's Frankfurt Lions.

In 2016, Ulmer moved to the UK's Elite Ice Hockey League to sign for the Cardiff Devils where he spent the next three seasons - one as Alternate captain - before departing in August 2019.

Ulmer then - on 5 August 2019 - signed a one-year deal with Cardiff's EIHL counterparts Manchester Storm.

Awards and honours

Career statistics

Regular season and playoffs

See also
List of players who played only one game in the NHL

References

External links

1980 births
Living people
Canadian ice hockey centres
Charlotte Checkers (1993–2010) players
Frankfurt Lions players
Graz 99ers players
Hartford Wolf Pack players
HC TPS players
Asiago Hockey 1935 players
Cardiff Devils players
Manchester Storm (2015–) players
Ice hockey people from Saskatchewan
New York Rangers players
Ottawa Senators draft picks
Sportspeople from North Battleford
San Antonio Rampage players
Swift Current Broncos players
Canadian expatriate ice hockey players in England